is a Japanese snowboarder. He competed in the 2018 Winter Olympics.

References

2000 births
Living people
Snowboarders at the 2018 Winter Olympics
Japanese male snowboarders
Olympic snowboarders of Japan
21st-century Japanese people